Horst Christill (born 1959) is a German church musician and composer of sacred music, especially hymns of the genre Neues Geistliches Lied (NGL).

Life and career 
Born in Annweiler am Trifels, Christill first studied from 1976 music pedagogy, focused on piano, at the Musikhochschule Saarbrücken, completing with the concert exam in 1983. He then studied Catholic church music at the Johannes Gutenberg-Universität Mainz, completing with the A exam in 1988. He was pianist and keyboard player of the band Habakuk from 1995 to 1999, recording several albums.He was church musician at the Wetzlar Cathedral which is used by a Catholic parish and a Protestant parish, from 1996 to 2018, again also as Bezirkskantor. He was also a member of the group for church music aimed at young people in the diocese.

Work 
Christill composed the music for many new hymns by Eugen Eckert, including:

References

External links 
 

German classical organists
Sacred music composers
People from Südliche Weinstraße
1959 births
Living people